Alyssa Rae Nicole Lampe (born March 10, 1988) is an American freestyle wrestler. She won bronze medals in the 48 kg and 51 kg weight classes at the 2012 and 2013 Women's World Championships. She competes with the Sunkist Kids Wrestling Club. Lampe has been a member of Team USA from 2009-16 and then returned in 2021-22. She has been a member of the United States's World team a total of five times.

Career

High school 
Originally from Tomahawk, Wisconsin, Lampe wrestled for Tomahawk High School. She was the first female wrestler to qualify for the state wrestling meet, and the first girl to wrestle for a Wisconsin state championship. She competed at state three times and placed second at the 2006 State Championships. During her senior year, she won 47 of 53 matches, but lost the Division 2 state title to Thane Antczak. She finished her high school career 133-21 for a .811 winning percentage competing against boys.

Collegiate 
After high school, she attended Northern Michigan University, where she was part of the U.S. Olympic Education Program and trained with coaches Shannyn Gillespie and Tony DeAnda. In May 2007, Lampe was recognized as the women's freestyle athlete of the semester at the U.S. Olympic Education Center. She eventually decided to move to Colorado Springs, Colorado, to join the U.S. Olympic Training Center resident program. At the training center, she trained with coaches Terry Steiner and Izzy Iboinikov.

Age-group programs (2004-2006) 
Lampe's first successes came at national level in 2004. She would eventually earn bronze at the 2007 and 2008 Junior Worlds.

Senior-level career (2007-2016) 
Lampe began her Senior career in 2007 and would go on to be a six-time National Team member at the 48 kg/105 lb weight class. She represented the United States at five World Championships and earned bronze twice. Her first bronze and first international medal win was on at the Junior World Championships in Beijing in 2007. She again won a bronze medal in the 48 kg weight class at the 2008 Junior World Championships in Istanbul.

She came close to making the U.S. Senior World Team in both 2008 and 2009, placing second to 2008 World Champion and Olympian Clarissa Chun. She would eventually beat Chun in 2010 to win the title at the World Team Trials and qualify for her first Senior World Team.

In 2009, after placing third at the U.S. Championships in 51 kg weight class, Lampe won the title in that same weight class at the Pan American Championships in Maracaibo. She won the title against competitors Terri McNutt (Canada) and Romina Gonzalez (Argentina).  In 2010, Lampe was the U.S. champion in the 48 kg weight class ahead of Mary Kelly, Sara Fulp-Allen and Victoria Anthony. She also won the World Championship Trials ahead of Clarissa Chun and Sara Fulp-Allen. At the 2010 World Championships in Moscow, she lost her first match against Iwona Matkowska, Poland, on points. Since Matkowska did not reach the final, Lampe was eliminated and came in 20th place.

In 2011, Lampe took second place behind Chun at the World Championship Trials and the U.S. Olympic Trials. She competed in the 51 kg weight class at the 2012 Women's World Championships, beating Angela Dorogan (Azerbaijan) and Roksanan Zasina (Poland), before losing to Sun Yanan (China). She would eventually earn a bronze medal by Elenora Abutalipowa of Kazakhstan.

Lampe won back-to-back bronze medals at the 2012 and 2013 Senior World Championships.

In 2013,  Lampe became USA champion for the second time in the 48 kg weight class and also won the World Championship Trials. At the 2013 World Championships in Budapest, she won another bronze medal with a win against Davi Nirmala (India), a loss against Eri Tosaka (Japan) and victories over Madalina Linguraru (Romania) Tatjana Amanschol-Bakatschuk (Kazakhstan) and Melanie LeSaffre (France).

Individual placings and medals

Retirement (2016-2019) 
Lampe took a hiatus from the sport in 2016. In December 2019, she returned to wrestling with a No. 1 finish at the 2019 Senior Nationals.

Return to wrestling (2019-present) 
Lampe returned to wrestling in 2019 to train for the 2020 Tokyo Olympics, training with fellow Team USA member Erin Clodgo. While training in Vermont, Lampe joined Clodgo as a coach at Norwich University, which began her professional coaching career. 

In her first competition back, Lampe won the December 2019 Senior Nationals title at the 50 kg/110 lbs weight class in Fort Worth, Texas. She started training at the Beaver Dam Regional Training Center in December 2020.

During the 2021-22 season, Lampe was ranked No. 3 at the 50 kg/110 lbs weight class. She was named a member of the 2022 U.S. World Cup team for the freestyle event in Coralville, Iowa, Dec. 10-11, 2022.

Coaching 
Lampe started coaching as a volunteer assistant coach at Norwich University in 2019. She continued there until 2021 when she was hired as a full-time assistant coach at Linfield University.

Awards 
Lampe was named the 2013 USA Wrestling Women's Wrestler of the Year and 2013 U.S. Open Outstanding Wrestler. She was the first female athlete inducted into the George Martin Wrestling Hall of Fame in Wisconsin. Other accolades include: 

 USA Wrestling Athlete of the Week in 2019 after winning the Senior Nationals in her first return competition.
 TheMat.com Wrestler of the Week in 2014 after winning the U.S. Open on April 19, 2014, earning her a spot at the World Team Trials.
 TheMat.com Wrestler of the Week in 2013 after winning the Poland Open championship.
 USOC Athlete of the Month, November 2012.
 TheMat.com Wrestler of the Week in 2012 after winning the U.S. Women's World Team Wrestle-off.
 TheMat.com Wrestler of the Week for June 8-14, 2010, after winning th 48 kg/105 lbs title at the World Team Trials.
 Women's Freestyle Athlete of the Semester at the U.S. Olympic Education Center, May 2007
 Outstanding Wrestler at the 2005 Body Bar Women's FILA Cadet Nationals.

References

External links
 

1988 births
Living people
American female sport wrestlers
Place of birth missing (living people)
World Wrestling Championships medalists
Pan American Games medalists in wrestling
Pan American Games bronze medalists for the United States
Wrestlers at the 2015 Pan American Games
Medalists at the 2015 Pan American Games
21st-century American women